Aberdare  railway station is a railway station serving the town of Aberdare in Rhondda Cynon Taf, Wales. Passenger services are provided by Transport for Wales.

Overview 

Passenger rail services into the town on both lines fell victim to the Beeching Axe in 1964, with the last train running on the former VoN line on 13 June and over the ex-TVR line from Cardiff on 30 October However part of the VoN line west of the town remained open for coal trains serving Tower Colliery at Hirwaun, which was then accessed by the former Taff Vale line. This was also retained to serve various collieries and a coking plant further down the valley at Abercwmboi. From 1968 though, this route was reduced to single track to reduce maintenance costs.

Goods traffic through the ex-VoN High Level station ended in 1965 and the line fell into disuse, but in August 1973 it was reopened to release the former TVR line trackbed and station site for road improvements (including the removal of an inconveniently-located level crossing - the town bus station now occupies the site). All services were diverted onto the old VoN line via a new connection between the two lines near Cwmbach and then on through the old High Level station to regain their former route at Gadlys Junction. The new connection was carried over the River Cynon on a girder bridge that had previously been used to carry the defunct  to  branch line across the A40 road at Wheatley, Oxfordshire.

The fact that the line remained open made it possible to reinstate passenger services to the town, which started again under British Rail and Mid Glamorgan in October 1988 using a new platform close to the old disused one (the old High Level station building still survives and can be seen from the current station). Freight continued to run several times a day from the colliery over track owned by it, until Tower Colliery's final closure on 18 January 2008. EWS still ran trains to the Tower washery on Wednesday, Thursday, Friday and Saturday for some time afterwards to clear coal stocks from the site. These departed Aberdare at 7:00 pm on Wednesdays and 11:30 am on Thursdays, Fridays and Saturdays, these trains were hauled by occasional Class 60s but a high proportion of these services were Class 66 hauled. Freightliner also operate stone trains to Tower but this service varies, these trains are usually hauled by a Class 66 diesel locomotive.

Announced in November 2009 the Welsh Assembly Government has asked Network Rail to conduct a feasibility study on reopening the line to Hirwaun for passenger services. Network Rail is expected to clear the line of vegetation and assess the track bed before publishing its report in 2010, before any business cases to reopen the line is then developed.

It was announced in March 2011 that the Welsh Assembly Government's 2011-12 capital programme would include the re-opening of the line to Hirwaun as part of the Cynon Valley Scheme  although the project appears to have advanced little at that time. In 2019–2020, Cardiff Capital Region City Deal's Transport Authority secured £100,000 of funding from the Welsh Government's Local Transport Fund to undertake Welsh Transport Appraisal Guidance (WelTAG) 1 study into the feasibility of extending Aberdare Line passenger services through reopened  and Hirwaun stations to a new terminus serving the Tower strategic development site.

Facilities

Along with other stations on the Merthyr Line, Aberdare has undergone construction work to lengthen the platform. This now allows four-car trains to stop at the station. The platform also has a staffed ticket counter, which is open six days per week from early morning until mid-afternoon. Train running information is offered via CIS displays, a help point and timetable posters. Car parking is provided at the station.

The high level station building is being restored to become a bistro cafe for students, staff and the public, as part of the new Coleg y Cymoedd campus.

Services
On Mondays to Saturday daytimes, the service from Aberdare is a half-hourly service to Barry Island, via . In the evenings this drops to hourly and certain late night trains run to  rather than Barry Island.  Services are formed of Class 150 Sprinter units.

On Sundays there is a general 2-hourly service to Barry Island with an hourly service in the morning and in the late afternoon. This is due to a campaign by the local Assembly Member and a successful trial in December 2017. The extra services began in April 2018.

There is a dedicated rail linc bus that links with the train. It is only available to rail passengers and operates to Penywaun, Hirwaun, Cefn Rhigos and Rhigos. The rail link bus no longer operates, but rail linc tickets are valid for use on Stagecoach buses that serve the aforementioned communities and plans are being developed to reintroduce passenger rail services to Trecynon and Hirwaun.

Notes

References
Body, G. (1983), PSL Field Guides - Railways of the Western Region, Patrick Stephens Ltd, Wellingborough, 
Holland, Julian (2013) Dr Beeching's Axe: 50 Years on : Illustrated Memories of Britain's Lost Railways;  David & Charles Publishers, Newton Abbott, 
Page, J. (1988), Forgotten Railways: Volume 8 - South Wales (2nd Ed), David & Charles Publishers, Newton Abbott,

External links

Photo of the current (BR) & former (VoN) stations at Aberdare High Level

Railway stations in Rhondda Cynon Taf
DfT Category E stations
Railway stations opened by British Rail
Railway stations in Great Britain opened in 1988
Railway stations served by Transport for Wales Rail
railway station
1988 establishments in Wales